Syed Shaban Bukhari is the Deputy Shahi Imam of the Jama Masjid, Delhi.

He was appointed Naib Imam of Jama Masjid and is next in line to succeed his father. The dastarbandi ceremony took place in Jama Masjid.

Marriage
While pursuing Bachelor's Degree in Social Work from Amity University, Shaban married a Hindu girl from Ghaziabad with whom he was in a relationship for couple of years. It was reported that she had agreed to convert to Islam and was also learning Quran.

Family
Born in Delhi, India, on March 11, 1995, Syed Shaban Bukhari hails from the family of Islamic theologists who have since their past thirteen generations presided over the Grand Mosque “Jama Masjid”, Delhi, India, built in the year 1656 by the Mughal Emperor Shahjahan who gave the world the wonderful Taj Mahal.The same Emperor Shahjahan appointed Syed Abdul Ghafoor Shah Bukhari, who was the great grandfather of Syed Shaban Bukhari, as the First Imam of Jama Masjid Delhi and decreed that the Imamat shall continue in the same family.

Keeping the tradition, in the year 2014, Syed Shaban Bukhari was appointed as the Vice (Naib) Shahi Imam of Jama Masjid, Delhi, India, by his father, the Thirteenth Shahi Imam, Maulana Syed Ahmed Bukhari.

References

Indian imams
21st-century imams
Indian Quran reciters
Indian Islamic religious leaders
Living people
Year of birth missing (living people)